Sabine Renate Huebner/Hübner (born 1976) is Professor of Ancient History at the University of Basel (Switzerland) and Head of Department. She is an expert on the religious and social history of antiquity, particularly of Graeco-Roman Egypt.

Early life and education
Born in Osnabrück (Germany), Huebner studied History and Classics in Münster, Rome, Berlin, Jena, and London (MA Münster, 2001; PhD Jena, 2005; Habilitation FU Berlin, 2010). She received her PhD from the University of Jena in 2005. Her thesis was entitled Der Klerus in der Gesellschaft des spätantiken Kleinasiens (The Clergy in the Society of Late Antique Asia Minor). Her doctoral supervisor was Walter Ameling. After receiving her PhD she was a Postdoc, adjunct assistant professor and visiting research scholar at several research institutions in the USA (2005 – 2010): at the University of California at Berkeley (2005), at Columbia University (2006-2009), at the Institute for the Study of the Ancient World (ISAW) in New York City (2007-2008), and at the Institute for Advanced Study (School of Historical Studies) in Princeton, New Jersey (2010). In 2011/12, she was a research fellow at the Max Planck Institute for Demographic Research in Rostock, in 2011/12 membre eluée at the  “Orient et Méditerranée“ at the Collège de France, Paris, and in 2012/13 visiting scholar at the Institutum Romanum Finlandiae and the British School at Rome.(see CV).

Huebner was awarded research fellowships by the German Research Foundation (2006/7), the German Academic Exchange Service (2003; 2006/7), the Institute for the Study of the Ancient World at NYU (2007/8), the European Research Council (Marie Curie OIF, 2007-2010), and the Max Planck Institute for Demographic Research (2010/11). In 2010 she was awarded a membership at the Institute for Advanced Study (School of Historical Studies) at Princeton, NJ. In 2011 she was granted a five-year Heisenberg-Fellowship by the German Research Foundation.

Career
Huebner has published on Roman and later Roman social history, Roman Egypt, early Christianity and the ancient family. At the University of Basel she heads the Department of Ancient Civilizations and the Institute of Ancient History. She is Member of the Board of Trustees of the Association of Members of the Institute for Advanced Study in Princeton, NJ, served as the general secretary of the International Federation of Associations of Classical Studies (FIEC), board member of the Schweizerische Vereinigung für Altertumswissenschaft / Association Suisse pour l'Étude de l'Antiquité ( SVAW/ASEA) and board member of the Schweizerische Patristische Arbeitsgemeinschaft / Groupe suisse d'études patristiques (GSEP) and one of the general editors of the Wiley Encyclopedia of Ancient History (Oxford 2012-2015).. From 2023 - 2028 she will be the general editor of the Journal of Late Antiquity.

Huebner leads several projects funded by the Swiss National Science Foundation (SNSF), 1) the edition of the Basel papyrus collection (2015-2018), Egypt at the transition from the Byzantine to early Arab world, 6th to 8th centuries (2016-2019). and the Basel Climate Science & Ancient History Lab.

She was invited visiting professor at the Central European University in 2015, invited Visiting Professor and Stewart Fellow in Religion at Princeton University in 2018, and the RD Milns Invited Visiting Professor at the University of Queensland at Brisbane in 2019.

She has four children with Stéphane Piatzszek, a French screenwriter.

Bibliography 

 Huebner, S. R., and Ratzan, D. (eds.) (2021) Missing Mothers. Maternal Absence in Antiquity (= Interdisciplinary Studies in Ancient Culture and Religion 22). (Leuven: Peeters). .
 Huebner, S. R. (2021) Reise in eine versunkene Welt. Eine Nubienexpedition im Frühjahr 1900. (Schweizerisches Institut für ägyptische Bauforschung und Altertumskunde in Kairo – Sonderschriften — 2). (Gladbeck: PeWe-Verlag). .
 Huebner, S. R. (2020) with W. Graham Claytor, Isabelle Marthot-Santaniello und Matthias Müller (eds.) Papyri of the University Library of Basel (P.Bas. II) (= Archiv für Papyrusforschung und verwandte Gebiete. Beihefte, Band 41). (Berlin: De Gruyter) .
 Huebner, S. R. (2020) with Eugenio Garosi, Isabelle Marthot-Santaniello, Matthias Müller, Stefanie Schmidt and Matthias Stern (eds.) Living the End of Antiquity. Individual Histories from Byzantine to Islamic Egypt. (Millennium-Studien / Millennium Studies, 84). (Berlin: De Gruyter) .
 Huebner, S. R. (2019) Papyri and the Social World of the New Testament (Cambridge, UK: Cambridge University Press)
 Huebner, S. R. and Christian Laes (eds.) (2019) The Single Life in the Roman and Later Roman Worlds (Cambridge, UK: Cambridge University Press)
 Huebner, S. R. and Nathan, G. (eds.) (2016) Mediterranean Families in Antiquity : Households, Extended Families, and Domestic Space (Oxford: Wiley-Blackwell)
 Huebner, S. R. and Caseau, B. (eds.) (2014) Inheritance, law and religions in the ancient and mediaeval worlds, Monographies / Centre de recherche d’histoire et civilisation de Byzance (Paris: ACHCByz)
 Huebner, S. R. (2013) The Family in Roman Egypt. A Comparative Approach to Intergenerational Solidarity and Conflict (Cambridge: Cambridge University Press)
 Bagnall, R. S., Brodersen, K., Champion, C. B., Erskine, A. and Huebner, S. R. (eds.) (2012) The Encyclopedia of Ancient History (Malden: Wiley-Blackwell)
 Huebner, S. R., and Ratzan, D. (eds.) (2009) Growing up Fatherless in Antiquity (Cambridge: Cambridge University Press)
 Huebner, S. R. (2005) Der Klerus in der Gesellschaft des spaetantiken Kleinasiens, Altertumswissenschaftliches Kolloquium (Stuttgart: Franz Steiner)

External links 
 Worldcat profile page
 University of Basel profile page
 German-language Wikipedia page

References

Living people
21st-century German historians
1976 births
Writers from Osnabrück